Camillus  may refer to:
An acolyte in a particular cult within the religion in ancient Rome
Camillus (feminine Camilla), a cognomen in ancient Rome
A hereditary cognomen in the gens Furia
Marcus Furius Camillus  
A given name derived from the cognomen, see Camille (disambiguation)
Camillus, New York may refer to either of the following jurisdictions in Onondaga County:
Camillus, New York 
Camillus (village), New York, wholly contained within the town
Camillus Cutlery Company